Johan Vásquez may refer to:

Johan Vásquez (footballer, born 1984), Peruvian footballer
Johan Vásquez (footballer, born 1998), Mexican footballer